The Yaoundé Multipurpose Sports Complex (French: Palais polyvalent des sports de Yaoundé) is an indoor sporting arena located in Yaoundé, Cameroon. The capacity of the Palais des sports de Warda is 5,263 people. It is used to host indoor sports such as basketball.

It was built by the People's Republic of China and was inaugurated on June 19, 2009.

Photos

External links
Venue information

Buildings and structures in Yaoundé
Indoor arenas in Cameroon
Basketball venues in Cameroon